The second and final season of the American television series Agent Carter, which is inspired by the 2011 film Captain America: The First Avenger and the 2013 Marvel One-Shot short film of the same name, features the character Peggy Carter, based on the Marvel Comics character of the same name, as she moves to Los Angeles to deal with the threats of the new atomic age in the wake of World War II, gaining new friends, a new home, and potential new love. It is set in the Marvel Cinematic Universe (MCU), sharing continuity with the films of the franchise, and was produced by ABC Studios, Marvel Television, and F&B Fazekas & Butters. Tara Butters, Michele Fazekas, and Chris Dingess served as showrunners.

In May 2015, a second season of Agent Carter was ordered, with Hayley Atwell, who reprises her role from the film series and One-Shot as Carter, returning to star. Alongside her, James D'Arcy, Chad Michael Murray, and Enver Gjokaj also return from the first season. Filming took place in Los Angeles in late 2015, with the season contrasting the lives of Carter and the Hedy Lamarr-inspired Whitney Frost, portrayed by recurring guest star Wynn Everett. Visual and practical effects were mixed to realize the setting and more fantastical elements of the series, while David Zippel and Louis van Amstel provided a musical dream sequence for the season. Other characters from previous MCU media also appear, as well as elements shared with the films and the television series Marvel's Agents of S.H.I.E.L.D.

The season, which aired on ABC from January 19 to March 1, 2016, over 10 episodes, aired during the season three mid-season break of Agents of S.H.I.E.L.D., receiving generally positive reviews. Critics praised the performances, setting, and the character development of Whitney Frost, but some elements, such as the season's ending and humor, were criticized, and viewership for the season was deemed too low. ABC canceled Agent Carter on May 12, 2016.

Episodes

Cast and characters

Main
 Hayley Atwell as Peggy Carter
 James D'Arcy as Edwin Jarvis
 Chad Michael Murray as Jack Thompson
 Enver Gjokaj as Daniel Sousa

Recurring
 Bridget Regan as Dottie Underwood
 Wynn Everett as Whitney Frost
 Reggie Austin as Jason Wilkes
 Currie Graham as Calvin Chadwick
 Lotte Verbeek as Ana Jarvis
 Lesley Boone as Rose Roberts
 Matt Braunger as Aloysius Samberly
 Kurtwood Smith as Vernon Masters
 Rey Valentin as Vega
 Ken Marino as Joseph Manfredi

Notable guests
 Ray Wise as Hugh Jones
 Dominic Cooper as Howard Stark
 Lyndsy Fonseca as Angie Martinelli

Production

Development
In January 2015, showrunners Michele Fazekas and Tara Butters confirmed that Agent Carter was not intended to be a miniseries, and that a possible second season would not necessarily be limited to eight episodes like the first. The series was renewed for a second season on May 7, 2015, intended to debut in 2016 of the 2015–16 season during the midseason break of the third season of Agents of S.H.I.E.L.D. Later in May, Hayley Atwell stated the season would consist of 10 episodes. Butters explained that this would probably not allow for any standalone episodes, "but I definitely think it allows for more character, because we can have more personal stories built into the framework of the overall arching mystery".

Writing

Before the second season was announced, Fazekas said that "We've certainly been talking about what a second season would look like...what's great about the structure of this show is, you can tell so many different stories and go so many different directions." Thus, Butters said of the first season storyline featuring Leviathan, "we wrapped up that story" already, with Toby Jones' cameo as Arnim Zola in the first-season finale just "a fun tie-in" rather than something that would be followed up on in the second season. Series creators Christopher Markus & Stephen McFeely revealed they "had a really nice story about who Peggy is and where she came from" that did not make it into the first season, but they hoped could be explored in a second, while Fazekas and Butters also revealed that there had been a story about Carter having "a night out with the girls" to explore her personal life, as well as more material for the character Angie, that they felt would both be easier to tell in a second season.

Season two is set in 1947, approximately six months to a year following the events of the first, with the time jump made to show "people are in a little bit different positions, and things have happened between these seasons that we maybe don't know about." Fazekas noted that "the challenge" for the season was to find a way to reunite Carter with Edwin Jarvis since he is "not an agent....that's a really important relationship, how do we keep them together?...The nice thing about Peggy this season is she's not having to hide her agenda from the SSR. [Jarvis] is helping her out, just in a different way." Elaborating on the SSR's role in the season, Fazekas explained that when Markus and McFeely created the organisation for Captain America: The First Avenger it was inspired by the Office of Strategic Services (OSS), which was "somewhat disbanded after the war, because it was created because of World War II. So now that the war is over, things are changing. And in real history, the OSS sort of became the CIA and some of its other functions went under other departments. There's a little bit of change going on within SSR and so Thompson [is now the New York SSR chief, but he] has a boss [in Vernon Masters] that's going to be saying, "Look, things are changing, and you need to look out for yourself."" The season also sees Daniel Sousa promoted to the chief of the Los Angeles SSR office.

The fictional company Isodyne Energy, who is involved with nuclear testing in the desert, was influenced by the real life 1940s companies such as Radiodyne, General Atomic or the beginnings of the Jet Propulsion Lab, "all of which were in L.A. in the '40s, and were developing the space program and were developing nukes." Additionally, the season avoids depicting real life Hollywood stars from the 1940s because "the focus would shift from story to: does that person look or sound like an actor?" Instead, the character Whitney Frost is depicted as an actress "who will have a part to play in our larger storyline." The season introduces the Council of Nine, based on the Secret Empire, who "meet at the Arena Club, which is like this social club of white guys. They're just the guys who sort of run the world. They have orchestrated assassinations. We insinuate that they orchestrated the 1929 Stock Market crash." Members of the Council include powerful businessmen Calvin Chadwick and Hugh Jones, and their influence extends to "high levels of the government" as seen with War Department veteran Vernon Masters. Despite close similarities between the 'A' symbol of the Arena Club and a Hydra symbol introduced in the third season of Agents of S.H.I.E.L.D., Fazekas stated that she "would not say" there was a connection between the Council and Hydra.

With the introduction of Jason Wilkes and Frost, both considered "outsiders" as Carter was in the first season, co-showrunner Chris Dingess noted how their arcs in the season would be similar, yet different from Carter's, saying "I think everyone, to get to that place of getting respect, has a different road to get there. Everyone makes different choices along the way that define that road and I think with these three characters, everyone has a distinct, separate path." Atwell spoke specifically about the season's approach to diversity and prejudice, and noted that the series' crew had expanded to include African American and Asian writers as well as a female director. "Since the first season heavily focused on a woman in a man's world," Atwell said, "we're now going into more diversity and we're investigating different prejudices within this time and one of them absolutely would have been race, as we all know....if you have a staunchly white male cast then it might be more accurate of the time, but it becomes less relatable to our audiences, especially when the Marvel world's so diverse." On the racism issue, Butters stated, "We didn't want to just have an African-American character and not talk about that. That would have been very inauthentic." As for the sexism Frost faces, Gina McIntyre and Andrea Towers of Entertainment Weekly saw similarities with Marvel's Jessica Jones when Frost is asked to smile by two different men in her flashbacks in "Smoke & Mirrors". Towers said, "The talent agent [who asks Frost to smile] may not be the Purple Man, but Whitney is certainly being ushered into a brainwashed mindset that will set her on a path she can't deviate from easily."

At the conclusion of the season, Fazekas recalled the potential story revolving around Carter having a girls night out, saying that they realized that "once Peggy is on the mission, it starts to become difficult for her to have a social life...we kept sort of punting that scene because every time we tried to do it, it was like, 'She's not going to stop to go out to dinner. She has the world to save.'" Also, they felt they were not properly servicing Angie's character, instead "just sticking her in scenes just to be there," resulting in the decision to ultimately not bring Angie back for the season as planned. In her place, the characters of Ana Jarvis and Rose Roberts are featured as confidante's for Carter, "both people who are 100% in on Peggy's secret. Angie sort of figures it out at the end of the first season but Ana and Rose—there is no need to hide the truth from them. So it makes it a lot easier for her to confide in them."

Casting
Atwell, James D'Arcy, Chad Michael Murray, and Enver Gjokaj return from the first season to star as Peggy Carter, Edwin Jarvis, Jack Thompson, and Daniel Sousa, respectively. By July 2015, it was reported that Marvel was working to have Bridget Regan (Dottie Underwood) and Lyndsy Fonseca (Angie Martinelli) return for the season. At Fan Expo Canada the next month, Atwell confirmed that Regan would return for the season, with Dominic Cooper and Lesley Boone later also confirmed to be reprising their roles, respectively as Howard Stark and Rose Roberts. In December 2015, Fonseca was confirmed to return for a dream sequence in "A Little Song and Dance". Also returning for the second season was Ray Wise as Hugh Jones.

In August 2015, it was revealed that the character Whitney Frost would appear in the season, and Currie Graham was cast as her husband, Calvin Chadwick, the owner of Isodyne Energy. In October, Wynn Everett was revealed to be cast as Frost; Reggie Austin was cast as physicist Jason Wilkes; Lotte Verbeek was cast in the role of Ana Jarvis, the wife of Edwin Jarvis; and Kurtwood Smith was revealed to be recurring as Vernon Masters, a veteran of the War Department. The next month, Ken Marino was cast as Joseph Manfredi, leader of the Maggia crime syndicate. Additionally, Matt Braunger was cast as SSR lab tech Aloysius Samberly, and Rey Valentin was cast as SSR Agent Vega.

The dream sequence in "A Little Song and Dance", dubbed an informal crossover with Dancing with the Stars, features many of the professional dancers from that series, including Louis van Amstel, Dmitry Chaplin, Karina Smirnoff, Anna Trebunskaya, Sasha Farber, and Damian Whitewood. Dancers Robert Roldan, Malene Ostergaard, Amanda Balen, Serge Onik, Jenya Shatilova, Lacey Escabar, Alla Kocherga, and Paul Kirkland are also featured in the sequence.

Design
Series costume designer Giovanna Ottobre-Melton took inspiration from the films LA Confidential, Chinatown, and Who Framed Roger Rabbit to "represent the West Coast", and the "sunshine noir" feel of the era for the season. The then-just introduced "Dior New Look" is also referenced "with longer hemlines on supporting players." The dream sequence at the beginning of "A Little Song and Dance" was choreographed by van Amstel and begins in black and white, before transitioning to color. Head of make-up Debra LaMia Denaver explained that for the Zero Matter "wound" on Frost's face, the "guidelines were for it to be like a cracked porcelain doll and then the black matter would come from inside out. From there, Jay [Wejebe, makeup artist] designed the prosthetics that we use and Robin [Beauchesne, key makeup artist] created all the different avenues the dark matter takes." Using reference photographs and pre-made prosthetics, the make-up team were ultimately able to apply the effect to Everett in 30 minutes.

Filming
Filming for the season began on August 31, and ended on December 19, 2015, with Edward J. Pei serving as director of photography. Unlike the first season, episodes were filmed concurrently, two at a time. Discussing the series' location move, Head of Marvel Television Jeph Loeb explained that "Agent Carter season one took place in New York in 1946. It wasn't like we could go to New York and find 1946, so we shot in L.A. But that's part of the reason that when we talked about it, we said, 'You know what? This season let's stay in L.A.' Because so much of L.A. still looks like it did in 1946." Butters expanded by saying the move to L.A. "was something we had talked about in the middle of the first season...[and] we realized that not only was it a good idea for the storytelling, but also...it's much easier for us to shoot L.A. for L.A. than try to shoot L.A. for New York." She added the season hoped to film at Musso & Frank Grill, the Formosa Cafe, the Griffith Observatory, racetracks, piers, and other locations in Downtown Los Angeles.

The Universal Studios backlot serves as the backlot for the film studio Stark starts, Stark Pictures, with filming also taking place at the Los Angeles River. The Dunbar Hotel, a famous jazz club where both African-Americans and Caucasians would attend, is portrayed in the season. The showrunners looked to the films LA Confidential, Chinatown, The Big Heat, and The Lady from Shanghai when shaping the visuals for the season, with additional research provided by Pei. Butters said, "it doesn't feel like a different show. It just feels like an evolution of the show."

Visual effects
DNeg TV provided the visual effects for the season, with Sheena Duggal returning as visual effects supervisor. Effects created for the season included the Zero Matter and its related properties, such as people being frozen and shattered by it, the dimensional rifts and the levitated objects that get sucked into them, and Wilkes becoming intangible. Frost's Zero Matter "crack" on her face was also augmented with visual effects, to add depth, sentience, and an "infinite black" by color-correcting the image, with the effects animators studying "cracking glass to better capture the animation effect." 20 cast members were digitally scanned and modeled for interaction with Zero Matter, while many other instances required facial tracking markers on actors. For the Zero Matter itself, the design was described as a cross between "liquid spiders" and magnetic ferrofluid, the latter being used as an on set reference for the actors by Duggal. The main dimensional rifts were designed as black holes, based on the work of theoretical physicist Kip Thorne, which also inspired Double Negative's visual effects for Interstellar; the software developed for the film was reused for the series. DNeg TV also worked on Howard Stark's Hover car, using the original computer asset for the version seen in Captain America: The First Avenger. Despite the original car from the film being only a shell and destroyed after the picture, an identical Cadillac was found for DNeg to laser scan and incorporate into the episode along with the real car when it is parked on the ground.

Music
The dance number used in the dream sequence from "A Little Song and Dance" was an original song from lyricist David Zippel and series composer Christopher Lennertz, in conjunction with Butters and Fazekas. Titled "Whatcha Gonna Do (It's Up to You)", the single was performed by Atwell and Gjokaj along with the Hollywood Studio Symphony, and was released on iTunes on March 18, 2016.

Marvel Cinematic Universe tie-ins
In July 2015, Butters revealed that the season would feature the Darkforce, which ties to the characters Doctor Strange and Marcus Daniels, the latter having appeared in Agents of S.H.I.E.L.D. In January 2016, Fazekas elaborated, saying that the Darkforce, known as Zero Matter in the series, is the result of a nuclear test gone wrong by Isodyne Energy. Looking to the history of the Darkforce in the comics, Fazekas and Butters "were able to select what we liked and sort of make our own rules as to what it does, how it operates, and who it affects in our world." The producers tried to take a scientific approach to the explanation of the Zero Matter, consulting with theoretical physicist Clifford Johnson to help ground it in science. Johnson provided the science equations seen on blackboards throughout the season, as well as real world reference for the Zero Matter containment systems. The showrunners also conversed with Eric Carroll at Marvel Studios to ensure anything they were doing with the Darkforce would not contradict the Doctor Strange script, and to see if they could destroy Howard Stark's hover car, which was originally seen as a prototype in Captain America: The First Avenger. The mention in the season finale of the land Stark owns in Malibu is a reference to what will become the location for the home of his son, Tony, in the MCU films.

Marketing
Footage from the first episode was screened at New York Comic Con in October 2015, while the first trailer for the season was released in November. Alice Walker of Screen Rant felt that the promo "highlight[ed] the best parts of the show", calling it "[f]ast paced and slick" and Atwell "still incredibly charming". She further noted that "There is a long way to go before we see if they can build on the momentum from the previous season, but so far it looks like a fun adventure." Conversely, Kaitlin Thomas at TV.com called the promo "weird", asking, "Why is ABC marketing Agent Carter like it's one of the network's casually daft melodramas instead of a well-written drama[?]...From a tonal and thematic standpoint, the series depicted in that trailer feels like the polar opposite of what it actually is....cutting together a bunch of scenes of Peggy punching people or holding a gun does not make her a badass when its framed in this way, and frankly, it's no wonder people aren't tuning in if that's the type of show they think this is." In March 2016, Maureen Ryan, writing for Variety, described the season's promotion as "lackluster", and blamed "the botched rollout of Season 2" for the season's ultimately poor viewership.

Release

Broadcast
Season two of Agent Carter premiered on January 19, 2016 on ABC with a two-hour premiere, during the midseason break of the third season of Agents of S.H.I.E.L.D. It was originally scheduled to premiere on January 5, 2016, but was delayed due to an "earlier than usual" 2016 State of the Union Address. The season aired until March 1, 2016.

Home media
On November 29, 2017, Hulu acquired the exclusive streaming rights to the series, and the season was made available on Disney+ at launch, on November 12, 2019.

Reception

Ratings

The season averaged 4.37 million total viewers, including from DVR, ranking 109th among network series in the 2015–16 television season. It also had an average total 18-49 rating of 1.4, which was 88th.

Critical response
The review aggregator website Rotten Tomatoes reported a 76% approval rating with an average rating of 7.96/10 based on 21 reviews. The website's consensus reads, "A move from New York to Hollywood gives Agent Carter new territory to explore, as the series continues to search for a storyline as dynamic as its heroine." Varietys Brian Lowry was less positive, praising the casting and performances but saying, "Agent Carter feels too slavishly locked into the S.H.I.E.L.D. formula...it's sort of a shame Agent Carter isn't more compelling, since the impeccable period trappings and costumes make the series a nice change of pace, at least visually."

Eric Goldman of IGN gave the season an 8.3 out of 10, praising Atwell's performance, as well as the return of Dottie in the season and the additions of Ana Jarvis and Whitney Frost. Conversely, he felt Reggie Austin as Jason Wilkes was likable, but ultimately the "character felt a bit bland" and that the humor in the season was pushed "a bit too far". He concluded, "I don't think [the season] was quite as tightly-constructed as Season 1 and tonally, it sometimes wrestled with finding the right balance between the cool spy-action elements and the likable comedic aspect... But overall, it was another fun season filled with compelling characters—including a strong villain—and 1940s, Marvel-flavored spy heroics, which benefitted from the new visuals the Los Angeles setting gave it." Molly Freeman, reviewing the season finale for Screen Rant, called the season as a whole "Excellent", particularly praising the character development given to the character of Whitney Frost, but criticized the way that the season ended that character's storyline, stating that the finale "does a disservice to all the character development of Whitney throughout season 2....for the sake of sweeping her aside as easily as possible and giving the other cast members more development and screen time. After watching Agent Carter develop Whitney as such a powerful and sympathetic villain earlier this season, the way the show wrapped up her storyline is a disappointment." Bob Chipman, in a review of the whole season for the same website, disagreed, calling the season "consistently disappointing" and "a letdown" compared to the previous season.

Accolades
For the season, the series was nominated for Best Superhero Adaptation Series at the 42nd Saturn Awards.

References

General references

External links

 

2016 American television seasons